Simon David Buckingham (born in Oxford, England) is an English information society theorist and the originator of the term "unorganisation".
Buckingham has been based in New York since 2005.

Biography 

Buckingham created and published in 1996 the unorganisation philosophy. Subsequently, he became a serial entrepreneur.
He founded his first start up in 1999, Mobile Lifestreams, which started out as a research and consulting company.  
Buckingham authoring the "Yes 2 SMS" report that accurately predicted the success of the SMS text messaging service. Buckingham registered and launched the domain name and service ringtones.com. Mobile Lifestreams was renamed Mobile Streams and completed its initial public offering in February 2006 (LSE:MOS). At the same time, Liberty Media, the U.S. content company became a strategic investor in the company.

In January 2006, Buckingham become the CEO of Zoombak, a provider of GPS devices and services for family safety and enterprise applications. Zoombak was owned by Liberty Media but managed by Buckingham and Mobile Streams. More than 100,000 Zoombak devices had been shipped by October 2009.

In 2010, Buckingham founded his third start up in New York, Appitalism, an open app store, that launched in September 2010 in 51 countries.

In 2019, Buckingham founded his new start up in Florida, Nonvoice, https://www.nonvoice.com, a 5G and Augmenented Reality apps and services company https://www.mobileworldlive.com/featured-content/apps-home-banner/app-agency-seeks-to-build-5g-market
which launched many services such as its Alive 5G consumer portal
https://www.bangkokpost.com/business/2200755/tuc-nonvoice-alive-alliance-deliver-portal-of-5g-ar-apps

References

External links 

 Unorganization website [archived]

British information theorists
Living people
Date of birth missing (living people)
British businesspeople
Year of birth missing (living people)